Grandfalls-Royalty High School is a public high school located in Grandfalls, Texas (USA) and classified as a 1A school by the UIL. It is part of the Grandfalls-Royalty Independent School District located in southeast Ward County.  In 2015, the school was rated "Met Standard" by the Texas Education Agency.

In 2014, voters approved a $12,200,000 bond issue for constructing a new K-12 school to replace existing facilities.

Athletics
The Grandfalls-Royalty Cowboys compete in basketball, cross country, six-man football, tennis, track and field, and volleyball. They won a state title in six-man football (6M/D2) in 2013.

Notable alumni
Norm Cox, American player of gridiron football

References

External links
 Grandfalls-Royalty Independent School District

Schools in Ward County, Texas
Public high schools in Texas